DC Super Hero Girls: Hero of the Year is an American animated superhero film based on the DC Super Hero Girls franchise, produced by Warner Bros. Animation. The film premiered at the San Diego Comic-Con International on 24 July 2016, was released on Digital HD on 9 August 2016 and was released on DVD on 23 August 2016. It is the first film in the DC Super Hero Girls franchise.

Synopsis
It's time for the annual Hero of the Year ceremony and the students of Super Hero High compete for the top prize. But the festivities take a turn when Dark Opal targets the heroes and steals some of their most valued possessions to form the ultimate weapon! It's up to the students at Super Hero High to spring into action! But can Wonder Woman, Supergirl, Batgirl and Bumblebee stop Eclipso and her mysterious partner-in-crime to save the day?

Cast

 Yvette Nicole Brown as Principal Waller
 Dean Cain as Jonathan Kent
 Greg Cipes as Beast Boy
 Jessica DiCicco as Star Sapphire
 John DiMaggio as Gorilla Grodd
 Teala Dunn as Bumblebee
 Ashley Eckstein as Cheetah
 Anais Fairweather as Supergirl
 Nika Futterman as Hawkgirl
 Grey Griffin as Wonder Woman/Giganta
 Julianne Grossman as Queen Hippolyta
 Tania Gunadi as Lady Shiva
 Josh Keaton as Hal Jordan/Flash / Steve Trevor
 Tom Kenny as Crazy Quilt/Commissioner Gordon / Parasite
 Misty Lee as Big Barda
 Mona Marshall as Eclipso
 Danica McKellar as Frost
 Khary Payton as Cyborg
 Cristina Pucelli as Miss Martian/Amethyst
 Sean Schemmel as Dark Opal
 Stephanie Sheh as Katana
 Helen Slater as Martha Kent
 April Stewart as Alura
 Tara Strong as Harley Quinn/Poison Ivy
 Anna Vocino as Oracle
 Hynden Walch as Starfire
 B.J. Ward as Master Alchemist
 Mae Whitman as Batgirl
 Alexis G. Zall as Lois Lane

References

External links
 

2016 direct-to-video films
2016 animated films
2010s animated superhero films
2010s high school films
DC Super Hero Girls films
Direct-to-video animated films based on DC Comics
Animated teen superhero comedy films
2010s American animated films
2010s direct-to-video animated superhero films
American children's animated adventure films
American children's animated comedy films
American children's animated fantasy films
American children's animated superhero films
American fantasy adventure films
Warner Bros. Animation animated films
Warner Bros. direct-to-video animated films
American high school films
Films directed by Cecilia Aranovich
2010s English-language films